The Robert O. Pickard Environmental Centre is a waste water treatment facility in the Ottawa, Ontario, Canada. It provides secondary treatment to about 720,000 people.  

It is located at 800 Green Creek Dr., Ottawa, Ontario, and discharges to the Ottawa River. It was built in 1963 as a primary treatment plant, it was then later uprated to secondary treatment between 1988 and 1993. At the time of the upgrade, the site was named after the then Commissioner of Works.

It is also one of Canada's largest wastewater treatment facilities.

References

External links
City Of Ottawa Page

Sewage treatment plants in Canada
Buildings and structures in Ottawa